A delta-wye transformer is a type of three-phase electric power transformer design that employs delta-connected windings on its primary and wye/star connected windings on its secondary. A neutral wire can be provided on wye output side.  It can be a single three-phase transformer, or built from three independent single-phase units.  An equivalent term is delta-star transformer.

Transformers

Delta-wye transformers are common in commercial, industrial, and high-density residential locations, to supply three-phase distribution systems.

An example would be a distribution transformer with a delta primary, running on three 11 kV phases with no neutral or earth required, and a star (or wye) secondary providing a 3-phase supply at 415 V, with the domestic voltage of 240 available between each phase and the earthed (grounded) neutral point.

The delta winding allows third-harmonic currents to circulate within the transformer, and prevents third-harmonic currents from flowing in the supply line. 

Delta-wye transformers introduce a 30, 150, 210, or 330 degree phase shift.  Thus they cannot be paralleled with wye-wye (or delta-delta) transformers. However, they can be paralleled with identical configurations and some different configurations of other delta-wye (or wye-delta with some attention) transformers.

See also
 Electric power distribution
 High-leg delta
 Mains power systems
 Motor soft starter

References

External links
 Three-phase transformer circuits
 Three-phase voltage transformations

Electric transformers
Three-phase AC power